Greatest Hits is the first greatest hits album by American singer-songwriter Debbie Gibson. Released on September 1, 1995, the album compiles her Atlantic Records singles from 1987 to 1993.

As of December 1995, the album has sold more than 30,000 units.

Track listing

References

External links
 
 
 

1995 greatest hits albums
Debbie Gibson compilation albums
Albums produced by Lamont Dozier
Albums produced by Carl Sturken and Evan Rogers
Atlantic Records compilation albums